The Lasiosphaeriaceae are a family of fungi in the Ascomycota, class Sordariomycetes.

Genera
Anopodium
Apiosordaria
Apodospora
Apodus
Arecacicola
Arniella
Arnium
Bombardia
Bombardioidea
Camptosphaeria
Cercophora
Diffractella
Diplogelasinospora
Emblemospora
Eosphaeria
Fimetariella
Jugulospora
Lacunospora
Lasiosphaeria
Periamphispora
Podospora
Pseudocercophora
Schizothecium
Strattonia
Thaxteria
Triangularia
Tripterosporella
Zopfiella
Zygopleurage
Zygospermella

References

 
Sordariales
Taxa named by John Axel Nannfeldt